Frances Stewart Silver (born 1814 or 1815; died July 12, 1833) was hanged in Morganton, Burke County, North Carolina for the axe murder of her husband Charles Silver. Frankie Silver, as she was known, is believed to have been the first white woman put to death in Burke County.

Early life
She was born Frances Stewart, the daughter of Isaiah and Barbara (née Howell) Stewart. The family moved to Burke County when Frankie was young, around 1820. They lived in the town of Kona near the home of Jacob Silver who had lost his wife Elizabeth in childbirth. His son Charlie Silver was a year older than Frankie. Charlie and Frankie married and initially seemed a good pair. On 3 November 1830 their first daughter, Nancy, was born. They lived in a wooden cabin on land gifted by Jacob Silver.

At Christmas 1831 Charlie apparently went missing whilst out hunting. A search party could not find him. Jack Colliss decided to investigate while Frankie was in the village. He found bones in the fireplace and bloodstains on the floor. He called the sheriff. They found a head. 

Frankie and her mother and brother were arrested.

The motive for the murder is still not clear. It was claimed during the trial that Frankie was a jealous wife seeking revenge. Later theories asserted that she was an abused wife. There is no definitive evidence for either theory. Despite claims made by journalists at the time, Frankie never confessed, nor did she discuss her motive.

There is a theory that Frankie wanted to move west with her parents to join other family members, but Charles Silver refused to do so. There was also speculation that her frustration with Charles's refusal was the motive for the murder.

Murder
Although not discovered until January 1832 it was revealed that on December 22, 1831, Charles Silver (aka "Johnny Silver") was hacked to death with an axe and later dismembered in the cabin he shared with his wife, Frankie, and their 13-month-old daughter, Nancy.

Arrest and trial
Shortly after the murder, suspicion fell on Charles's wife Frankie, her mother Barbara Stuart, and her brother Jackson aka; "Blackstone" Stewart. All three were arrested. Barbara and Blackstone Stewart plead not guilty before a magistrate on January 17, 1832, and were discharged. Frankie alone stood trial for the murder.

The trial of Frankie began on 29 March 1832. Evidence would now be considered circumstantial. The jury were undecided but on an instruction had a further meeting and found Frankie guilty.

The investigation into the whereabouts of Charles Silver found a fireplace full of oily ashes, a pool of blood that had flowed through the cabin's puncheon floor, and blood spatters on the inside walls of the cabin. Pieces of bone and flesh were discovered in ashes poured into a mortar hole near the spring, as well as a heel-iron similar to those worn by Charles on his hunting moccasins.

According to Silver family lore, the evidence showed that Charles had been murdered and his body had been burned to hide the evidence.

Theoretical explanation
Frankie could either be interpreted as a family ties murderer for the possibility that she manipulated family members to help kill her husband, or a battered woman murderer for the possibility that she killed him in self-defense during one of the beatings he would give her. Whatever happened that night inside the family cabin remains a mystery. It is probable that she was a victim of abuse from her husband due to the fact that a petition was signed by townswomen and several members of the all-male jury in Frankie's favor. However this petition did not sway the Governor. Another reason this will always remain a mystery is because as Frankie was asked about her last words, legend has it her father yelled out from the crowd "Die with it in you, Frankie!". This made some believe, along with them helping her escape, that family members were involved in the killing of Charles Silver.

Escape from jail
During the time between her sentencing and hanging, Frankie was broken out of jail by someone who entered by way of one of the basement windows. With the aid of false keys, this person opened the doors leading to the prisoner's apartment.

Frankie was arrested again seven days later in Henderson County walking behind her father's wagon heading for Tennessee. When taken, she was dressed in men's clothes, and her hair been cut short. Her father and uncle were committed to jail as accessories to her escape.

The story goes as follows:

Execution and Burial
Frankie was hanged at Morganton, North Carolina on Friday 12 July 1833.

Frankie's father had intended to bring his daughter's body home and bury it in the family burial plot. However, extreme heat and humidity in North Carolina that year forced him to bury it in an unmarked grave behind the Buckhorn Tavern, a few miles west of Morganton. For many years, the exact location of the grave was unknown, but it is now believed to be in a remote corner of the present day Devault farm.

In 1952, a granite stone marking the probable location of the grave was placed by Beatrice Cobb, editor of the Morganton newspaper. The marker misspells Frankie's married name as "Silvers."

Popular culture
As a young college student in September 1963, author Perry Deane Young discovered the letters and petitions to the governor which turned upside down the traditional story of a jealous wife seeking her revenge. Thus began a lifelong crusade by Young to show through documentation that Frankie Silver was unjustly hanged. At the height of the Watergate hearings, Sen. Sam Ervin wrote to Young to concur that Frankie should never have been hanged. Young's book, The Untold Story of Frankie Silver, reproduced all of the documents which proved Frankie's innocence. His later play, Frankie, fictitiously gave the long-dead woman a chance to tell her side of the story. These accounts are known to be controversial, especially among descendants of the Silver family, who claim that "there were no documents to ever officially exist as this author suggests."
The case of Frankie Silver served as the basis of Sharyn McCrumb's 1999 novel, The Ballad of Frankie Silver. In it, McCrumb's series character Spencer Arrowood takes a fresh look at the Frankie Silver case and at a (fictional) modern murder with many parallels.
The 2000 film The Ballad of Frankie Silver and its re-release in  2010 as The Ballad of Frankie Silver:(Special Edition) DVD was written, directed, and produced by Theresa E. Phillips of Legacy Films Ltd. This film has a different theory of what actually happened.
In a 2013 episode of the Investigation Discovery show Deadly Women, Frankie Stewart Silver appears. The episode was titled "Brides of Blood."
A petition to have Frankie officially pardoned for the murder was formed unsuccessfully on April 9, 2013.
In 2016 Parkway Playhouse in Burnsville, North Carolina adapted Sharyn McCrumb's book into a stage show.

References

Bibliography

The Ballad of Frankie Silver, by Sharyn McCrumb
The Untold Story of Frankie Silver, by Perry Deane Young
Roaming the Mountains, by John Paris (LCCCN 55-12508)
The Ballad of Frankie Silver:(Special Edition) DVD by Legacy Films Ltd.
The Ballad of Frankie Silver: As told by Bobby McMillon in Folkstreams film 
http://www.folkstreams.net/film-detail.php?id=96

External links

The Ballad of Frankie Silver 

1810s births
1833 deaths
19th-century American criminals
19th-century American women
Year of birth uncertain
19th-century executions of American people
Executed American women
People executed by North Carolina by hanging
People convicted of murder by North Carolina
American people executed for murder
American female murderers
19th-century executions by the United States
Axe murder
Stabbing attacks in the United States
People from Morganton, North Carolina
Women in North Carolina
Mariticides
1831 murders in the United States